Lokomotiv is a passenger station on the Moscow Central Circle of the Moscow Metro that opened in September 2016.

Name
The station, which was to be named Cherkizovo, reflecting the name of a village originally on the site, was ultimately named Lokomotiv for the soccer team that plays its home games nearby.

Transfer
Lokomotiv offers out-of-station transfers to Cherkizovskaya on the Sokolnicheskaya Line. A new station was opened in 2021 for some overnight train services, rerouted from Moskva-Kurskaya station.

Gallery

References

External links 
 mkzd.ru

Moscow Metro stations
Railway stations in Russia opened in 2016
Moscow Central Circle stations
FC Lokomotiv Moscow